This article lists the episodes and short summaries of the first 22 episodes of the  anime series, known in the English dub as the second season of Ranma ½ or "Anything-Goes Martial Arts".

Rumiko Takahashi's manga series Ranma ½ was adapted into two anime series: Ranma ½ which ran on Fuji TV for 18 episodes and Ranma ½ Nettōhen which ran for 143. The first TV series was canceled due to low ratings in September 1989, but was then brought back in December as the much more popular and much longer-running Ranma ½ Nettōhen.

Viz Media licensed both anime for English dubs and labeled them as one. They released them in North America in seven DVD collections they call "seasons". The first 22 episodes of Nettōhen are season 2, which was given the titled "Anything-Goes Martial Arts". The ordering of several episodes was also re-arranged, effectively putting them closer to the order they appear in the original manga.

The introductory piece "Ranma You Pervert" is the lone opening theme for the first 6 episodes and for episodes 14 to 22.



Episode list

References
 Ranma ½ Perfect Edition Anime Episode Summaries

1989 Japanese television seasons
1990 Japanese television seasons
Season 2